Darío Anastacio Verón Maldonado (born 26 July 1979) is a former Paraguayan professional footballer that last played as a centre-back. He also holds Mexican citizenship.

Career
Verón joined Pumas in 2003, on a transfer from the Chilean club Cobreloa. Verón previously played for Club Guaraní and Club 12 de Octubre, clubs from his native country. A commanding central defender, Verón has also scored more than a dozen goals for UNAM because of his strength in the air. His nickname is "Hechicero" (The Wizard), a play on Juan Sebastián Verón's "Brujita" (Little Witch). He has become the most experienced defensive player in the Pumas lineup after Joaquín Beltrán moved to Necaxa and Sergio Bernal announced his retirement.

He has also earned some 50 caps for Paraguay, including the Copa América tournaments of 2001, 2007, and 2011, and the 2010 FIFA World Cup. Verón was a key part of the rigid defense that carried Paraguay to the final of the 2011 Copa América in Argentina, where he formed a sturdy central core alongside Paulo Da Silva. On occasion, he has also featured for Paraguay at right fullback.

Controversy
Verón has been accused of making racist insults by Felipe Baloy, Darwin Quintero and Michael Arroyo.

Honours

Club
Cobreloa
 Primera División de Chile (1): 2003 Apertura

Pumas UNAM
 Mexican Primera División (4): 2004 Clausura, 2004 Apertura, 2009 Clausura, 2011 Clausura
Trofeo Santiago Bernabéu: (1) 2004
 Campeón de Campeones (1): 2004

Olimpia
 Paraguayan Primera División (3): 2018 Clausura, 2018 Apertura, 2019 Apertura

Individual
Best Centre Back of the tournament: 2011 Clausura

References

External links

People from San Ignacio, Paraguay
1979 births
Living people
Paraguayan emigrants to Mexico
Naturalized citizens of Mexico
Paraguayan footballers
Paraguayan expatriate footballers
Paraguay international footballers
12 de Octubre Football Club players
Club Guaraní players
Cobreloa footballers
Club Universidad Nacional footballers
Club Olimpia footballers
Paraguayan expatriate sportspeople in Chile
Paraguayan expatriate sportspeople in Mexico
Expatriate footballers in Chile
Expatriate footballers in Mexico
Paraguayan Primera División players
Chilean Primera División players
Liga MX players
2010 FIFA World Cup players
2011 Copa América players
Association football central defenders